Theophil Andreas Luzius Sprecher von Bernegg (27 April 1850, Maienfeld – 6 December 1927) was a Swiss politician and military Chief of the General Staff (1905–1919).

At the outbreak of World War I, he declined the office of General, which led to Colonel Ulrich Wille being elected.

Sprecher was depicted on a Swiss stamp in 1950. A complete edition of his writings was published in 2002.

Works

Further reading

External links

1850 births
1927 deaths
People from Landquart District
Swiss Calvinist and Reformed Christians
Swiss military officers